Dingras Church is a Roman Catholic church located in the municipality of Dingras, Ilocos Norte, Philippines under the jurisdiction of the Roman Catholic Diocese of Laoag.

History 
Dingras started as a visita of Batac and became an independent parish by the Augustinians. Father Bartolome Conrado became the first parish priest in 1598.  It was reinstated as a visita in 1603 and back as a parish in 1605. The church was destroyed by earthquake in 1619, reconstructed before a fire in 1838, and lightning in 1853. Another church, largely known as the ruins of the Catholic Church of Dingras, was built by Augustinian friar Damaso Vieytez. It was restored and remodeled by Father Ricardo Deza with the help of Mayor Camilo Millan from 1879 to 1893. It was ruined by fire and earthquake in 1913. Now, the famous ruins of Dingras is reconstructed from its present site and now used as church building.

Architecture 

Notes

Bibliography

External links

Baroque architecture in the Philippines
Roman Catholic churches in Ilocos Norte
Marked Historical Structures of the Philippines
Spanish Colonial architecture in the Philippines
Churches in the Roman Catholic Diocese of Laoag